Triploceras is a genus of green algae in the family Desmidiaceae.

References

External links
 

Desmidiaceae
Charophyta genera